Andre Hoffman (born 23 April 1978) is a Zimbabwean cricketer. He played eighteen first-class matches between 1999 and 2003.

See also
 CFX Academy cricket team

References

External links
 

1978 births
Living people
Zimbabwean cricketers
CFX Academy cricketers
Mashonaland cricketers
Matabeleland cricketers
Sportspeople from Harare